Saarolepis is an extinct genus of jawless fish belonging to the family Birkeniidae.

References

External links 

 

Birkeniiformes genera
Fossil taxa described in 1945